The men's road race was the only road cycling event on the Cycling at the 1896 Summer Olympics programme. The course was 87 kilometres long and the race was held on 12 April. Seven cyclists from three nations competed. The event was won by Aristidis Konstantinidis of Greece. August von Gödrich of Germany took second, while Edward Battell finished third.

Background

This was the first appearance of the event, which would not be held again until 1936 (though has been held at every Summer Olympics since then). It was an event of particular interest to the Greek hosts, as it followed the course of the marathon won by Spyridon Louis. Seven cyclists entered the event, including the German August von Gödrich, the British Edward Battell, and five Greeks. Battell, who worked at the British Embassy, almost did not get to compete; "[s]ome British officials attempted to prevent him from entering the Olympic cycling events on the grounds that his job disqualified him as a gentleman, and thus he could not be an amateur."

Competition format

The race was on a course that covered 87 kilometres, running from Athens to Marathon and back. At the turn-around point, the cyclists had to "sign a document in the presence of an official, verifying that they had arrived there." The finish was at the velodrome. Officials were stationed all along the road.

Schedule

Results

Konstantinidis led from the start until after the turn at Marathon. His bicycle broke down on the return journey, allowing Battel time to pass him before he was able to get another bicycle and continue. Both Konstantinidis and Battel fell again before finishing, with Battel's fall being severe enough to drop him from first place to third as both Konstantinidis and Gödrich passed him.

References

  (Digitally available at )
  (Excerpt available at )
 

Road cycling at the 1896 Summer Olympics
Cycling at the Summer Olympics – Men's road race